Stanley Fischer (born October 15, 1943) is an Israeli American economist who served as the 20th Vice Chair of the Federal Reserve from 2014 to 2017. Fisher previously served as the 8th governor of the Bank of Israel from 2005 to 2013. Born in Northern Rhodesia (now Zambia), he holds dual citizenship in Israel and the United States. He previously served as First Deputy Managing Director of the International Monetary Fund and Chief Economist of the World Bank. On January 10, 2014, President Barack Obama nominated Fischer to be Vice-Chairman of the US Federal Reserve Board of Governors. He is a senior advisor at Blackrock. On September 6, 2017, Stanley Fischer announced that he was resigning as Vice-Chairman for personal reasons effective October 13, 2017, just before his 74th birthday.

Biography
Stanley (Shlomo) Fischer was born into a Jewish family in Mazabuka, Northern Rhodesia (now Zambia). When he was 13, his family moved to Southern Rhodesia (now Zimbabwe), where he became active in the Habonim Zionist youth movement. In 1960, he visited Israel as part of a winter program for youth leaders, and studied Hebrew at kibbutz Ma'agan Michael. He had originally planned to study at the Hebrew University of Jerusalem, but went to the United Kingdom to study after receiving a scholarship from the London School of Economics, and obtained his B.Sc. and M.Sc. in economics from 1962 to 1966. Fischer then moved to the United States to study at MIT, and earned a Ph.D. in economics in 1969 with a thesis titled Essays on assets and contingent commodities written under the supervision of Franklin M. Fisher. He became an American citizen in 1976.

Fischer was married to Rhoda Fischer (née Keet), whom he met during his days in Habonim. The couple has three children. When they moved to Israel, Rhoda became honorary president of Aleh Negev, a rehabilitation village for the disabled. Rhoda Fischer passed away in 2020.

Academic career
In the early 1970s, Fischer worked as an associate professor at the University of Chicago. He served as a professor at the MIT Department of Economics from 1977 to 1988.

In 1977, Fischer wrote the paper "Long-Term Contracts, Rational Expectations, and the Optimal Money Supply Rule" where he combined the idea of rational expectations argued by New classical economists like Robert Lucas with the idea that price stickiness still led to some degree of market shortcomings that an active monetary policy could help mitigate in times of economic downturns. The paper made Fischer a central figure in New Keynesian economics. Through this critique of new classical macroeconomics Fischer significantly contributed to clarifying the limits of the policy-ineffectiveness proposition.

He authored three popular economics textbooks, Macroeconomics (with Rüdiger Dornbusch and Richard Startz), Lectures on Macroeconomics (with Olivier Blanchard), and the introductory Economics, with David Begg and Rüdiger Dornbusch. He was also Ben Bernanke's, Mario Draghi's and Greg Mankiw's Ph.D. thesis advisor.

In 2012, Fischer served as Humanitas Visiting Professor in Economic Thought at the University of Oxford.

Banking career

From January 1988 to August 1990 he was Vice President, Development Economics and Chief Economist at the World Bank. He then became the First Deputy Managing Director of the International Monetary Fund (IMF), from September 1994 until the end of August 2001. By the end of 2001, Fischer had joined the influential Washington-based financial advisory body, the Group of Thirty. After leaving the IMF, he served as Vice Chairman of Citigroup, President of Citigroup International, and Head of the Public Sector Client Group. Fischer was an executive at Citigroup from February 2002 to April 2005, earning millions of dollars in salary and stock.

Bank of Israel
Fischer was appointed Governor of the Bank of Israel in January 2005 by the Israeli cabinet, after being recommended by Prime Minister Ariel Sharon and Finance Minister Benjamin Netanyahu. He took the position on May 1, 2005, replacing David Klein, who ended his term on January 16, 2005. Fischer became an Israeli citizen but did not renounce U.S. citizenship.

He had been involved in the past with the Bank of Israel, having served as an American government adviser to Israel's economic stabilization program in 1985. On May 2, 2010, Fischer was sworn in for a second term.

Under his management, in 2010, the Bank of Israel was ranked first among central banks for its efficient functioning, according to IMD's World Competitiveness Yearbook.

Fischer has earned plaudits across the board for his handling of the Israeli economy in the aftermath of the global financial crisis. In September 2009, the Bank of Israel was the first bank in the developed world to raise its interest rates.

In 2009, 2010, 2011 and 2012 Fischer received an "A" rating on the Central Banker Report Card published by Global Finance magazine.

In June 2011, Fischer applied for the post of IMF managing director to replace Dominique Strauss-Kahn, but was barred as the IMF stipulates that a new managing director must be no older than 65, and he was 67 at the time.

On June 30, 2013, Fischer stepped down as governor of the Bank of Israel midway through his second term, despite high popularity.

U.S. Federal Reserve
American President Barack Obama nominated Fischer as Vice Chair of the Federal Reserve System, the United States' central bank, in January 2014. In nominating Fischer for the position, Obama stated he brought decades of leadership and expertise from various roles, including serving at the International Monetary Fund and the Bank of Israel.

On May 21, 2014, the Senate confirmed Fischer's appointment to the Federal Reserve Board of Governors. In a separate vote on June 12, he was confirmed as the vice chair. Fischer succeeded Janet Yellen as vice chair; Yellen became chair of the Federal Reserve earlier in 2014. Fischer resigned for personal reasons in mid-October, 2017, 8 months before the June, 2018, expiry of his term as vice chair.

Awards and recognition 
Fischer received an honorary doctorate from Hebrew University in 2006. In October 2010, Fischer was declared Central Bank Governor of the Year by Euromoney magazine.

He is a member of the Bilderberg Group and attended its conferences in 1996, 1998 and 1999. Apparently he also attended the Bilderberg conference in 2011 in St. Moritz, Switzerland. However, his name does not show up on the list of participants for the year 2011 as of March 2016. He is also a Distinguished Fellow in the Council on Foreign Relations (CFR). Fischer was named a Distinguished Fellow of the American Economic Association in 2013. He is also a member of the Inter-American Dialogue.

References

External links

 Profile at the Federal Reserve
 Profile at the Bank of Israel
 Profile at the International Monetary Fund
 Profile at Bloomberg Businessweek
 Profile at the Council on Foreign Relations
 Profile at the Peterson Institute for International Economics
 List of publications, 1994–present
 Publications at the National Bureau of Economic Research
 Statements and Speeches of Stanley Fischer

 Column archive at Project Syndicate
 
 
 
 
 

Articles
 "Exchange Rate Regimes: Is the Bipolar View Correct?", International Monetary Fund, Distinguished Lecture on Economics in Government, American Economic Association and the Society of Government Economists. Delivered at the Meetings of the American Economic Association, New Orleans, January 6, 2001
 Stanley Fischer: The Life of an Internationally Renowned Economist, Citigroup, August 13, 2004
 Why so gloomy on the global economy?, The Banker, 4 October 2004
 Citigroup's Fischer to Head Israel's Central Bank, Bloomberg, January 9, 2005
 Israel looks to US for bank chief, BBC News, 10 January 2005
 C. Peter McColough Series on International Economics: The Israeli Economy: Thriving in a Complicated Environment, Council on Foreign Relations, October 18, 2007

1943 births
Living people
20th-century American economists
20th-century American Jews
21st-century American economists
21st-century American Jews
Alumni of the London School of Economics
American emigrants to Israel
American officials of the United Nations
Citigroup employees
Distinguished Fellows of the American Economic Association
Fellows of the American Academy of Arts and Sciences
Fellows of the Econometric Society
Governors of the Bank of Israel
Group of Thirty
Honorary Fellows of the London School of Economics
International finance economists
Israeli economists
Israeli Jews
Israeli officials of the United Nations
Macroeconomists
MIT School of Humanities, Arts, and Social Sciences alumni
MIT School of Humanities, Arts, and Social Sciences faculty
Members of the Inter-American Dialogue
Naturalized citizens of Israel
New Keynesian economists
Peterson Institute for International Economics
Rhodesian Jews
Vice Chairs of the Federal Reserve
World Bank Chief Economists
Zambian emigrants to the United States
Zambian Jews
Obama administration personnel
Trump administration personnel